Ausland may refer to:

Ausland, a German word meaning outland or foreign lands
Torpedoboot Ausland, small destroyers or large torpedo boats captured by Nazi Germany

Places
Ausland, Norway, a village in Gjerstad municipality in Aust-Agder county, Norway
Ausland, Risør, a small village in Risør municipality in Aust-Agder county, Norway

See also
McAusland, a list of people with a similar last name